This article refers to sports broadcasting contracts in India. For a list of contracts in other countries, see Sports television broadcast contracts.

American Football 
 NFL - Star Sports & Disney+ Hotstar

Association Football

Badminton

Basketball 
NBA - Sports18 & Voot
EuroLeague - FanCode

Cricket

Golf 
Masters Tournament - Star Sports & Disney+ Hotstar
PGA Championship - None
U.S. Open - Eurosport India & Discovery+
The Open Championship - Eurosport India & Discovery+
PGA Tour - Eurosport India & Discovery+
Indian Open - Eurosport India & Discovery+

Hockey 
Men's FIH Hockey World Cup - Star Sports & Disney+ Hotstar
Women's FIH Hockey World Cup - Star Sports & Disney+ Hotstar
Men's FIH Pro League - Star Sports & Disney+ Hotstar
Women's FIH Pro League - Star Sports & Disney+ Hotstar
 Men's Hockey Asia Cup - Star Sports & Disney+ Hotstar
 Women's Hockey Asia Cup - None
 Men's Asian Champions Trophy - Star Sports & Disney+ Hotstar
 Women's Asian Champions Trophy - None
 Hockey India League - TBD

Kabaddi 
Pro Kabaddi League - Star Sports & Disney+ Hotstar

Kho Kho 
Ultimate Kho Kho - Sony Sports Network & SonyLIV

MMA 
UFC - Sony Sports Network & SonyLIV
ONE Championship - Star Sports & Disney+ Hotstar
King of Kings - DAZN

Motorsport 
Formula 1 - Star Sports & Disney+ Hotstar
Formula E - Star Sports & Disney+ Hotstar
Moto GP - Eurosport India & Discovery+
WTCR - Eurosport India & Discovery+

Multi-Sport events 
 Summer Olympics - Sony Sports Network & SonyLIV
 Winter Olympics - DD Sports
 Summer Paralympics - Eurosport India & Discovery+
 Winter Paralympics - None
 Commonwealth Games - Sony Sports Network & SonyLIV
 Asian Games - Sony Sports Network & SonyLIV
World Athletics Championships - Sony Sports Network & SonyLIV
National Games of India - DD Sports
 Khelo India Youth Games - Star Sports & Disney+ Hotstar

Pro-Wrestling 
WWE - Sony Sports Network & SonyLIV
All Elite Wrestling - Eurosport India & Discovery+
Pro Wrestling League - Sony Sports Network & SonyLIV

Table Tennis 
World Table Tennis Championships - Eurosport India & Discovery+
Ultimate Table Tennis - Star Sports & Disney+ Hotstar

Tennis

Volleyball 
Prime Volleyball League - Sony Sports Network & SonyLIV

See also 
Football broadcast in India
Sports broadcasters in India

References 

 
India